Bobby Z may refer to:

People
Bob Dylan (born 1941), American musician, born Robert Zimmerman
Robert Zemeckis (born 1952), American director, occasionally nicknamed "Bobbie Z" 
Bobby Z (monster truck driver) (born 1967), monster truck driver
Bobby Z. (born 1956), American musician
Bobby Zamora (born 1981), English footballer
Bobby Z (wrestler) (born 1991), Mexican professional wrestler

Film
The Death and Life of Bobby Z, a 2007 action film

Z, Bobby